Schult is a German surname. Notable people with the surname include:
Art Schult (born June 20, 1928 in Brooklyn, New York) is a former Major League Baseball player.
Emil Schult (born 10 October 1946 in Dessau, Germany) is a German painter, poet and musician.
HA Schult (born 24 June 1939 in Parchim, Mecklenburg) is a German installation, happening and conceptual artist.
Jürgen Schult (born May 11, 1960 in Amt Neuhaus, Lower Saxony) is a German track and field athlete and the current world record holder.
Rolf Schult (born April 16, 1927) is a German dubbing actor and real-life actor
Almuth Schult, German goalkeeper

See also 
Josef August Schultes (1773-1831), Austrian botanist whose standard scientific abbreviation is Schult.
Julius Hermann Schultes (1804-1840), Austrian botanist whose standard scientific abbreviation is Schult.f.

German-language surnames